Pumanque is a Chilean commune in Colchagua Province, O'Higgins Region.

Demographics
The population fell by 8.8% (331 persons) between the 1992 and 2002 censuses.

Administration
As a commune, Pumanque is a third-level administrative division of Chile administered by a municipal council, headed by an alcalde who is directly elected every four years. The 2021-2024 mayor is Gonzalo Baraona Bezanilla.

References

External links
  Municipality of Pumanque

Communes of Chile
Populated places in Colchagua Province